Sphenomorphus malaisei is a species of skink found in Myanmar. It is only known from the type specimen which was collected in early 1900s.

References

malaisei
Reptiles of Myanmar
Reptiles described in 1937